This is a list of compositions by Zygmunt Stojowski.

Piano

Piano solo
Mélodie, Op. 1/1
Prélude, Op.1/2
Deux caprices-études, Op. 2
Trois Intermèdes, Op. 4
Berceuse, Op. 5/1
Scherzo, Op. 5/2
Gondoliera, Op. 5/3
Mazurka, Op. 5/4
Légende, Op. 8/1
Mazurka, Op. 8/2
Serenade, Op. 8/3
Romance, Op. 10/1
Caprice, Op. 10/2
Polonaise, Op. 12/1
Valse, Op. 12/2
Mazurka, Op. 12/3
Cracovienne, Op. 12/4
Mazurka, Op. 12/5
Cosaque Fantastique, Op. 12/6
Dumka, Op. 14
Rêverie, Op. 15/1
Intermezzo-Mazurka, Op. 15/2
Au Soir, Op. 15/3
Deux Caprices, Op. 16
Feuillet d'Album, Op. 19/1
Moment musical, Op. 19/2
Arabesque, Op. 19/3
Barcarolle, Op. 19/4
Mazurka, Op. 19/5
Polnische Idyllen, Op. 24
Geständnis, Op. 25/1
En valsant, Op. 25/2
Idylle, Op. 25/3
Barcarolle, Op. 25/4
Frühlingserwachen, Op. 25/5
Mélodie, Op. 26/1
In tempo di Minuetto, Op. 26/2
Chant d’Amour, Op. 26/3
Thème Cracovien Varié, Op. 26/4
Two Mazurkas, Op. 28
Ballade, Op. 29/1
Aufschwung, Op. 29/2
Zwielicht, Op. 29/3
Cappricio, Op. 29/4
Serenade, Op. 29/5
Valse – Impromptu, Op. 29/6
Amourette de Pierrot, Op. 30/1
Feuilles mortes, Op. 30/2
Près du ruisseau, Op. 30/3
Trois études de concert, Op. 35
Rêves, Op. 36/1
Rayons et reflets, Op. 36/2
Fleurettes, Op. 36/3
Bruissements, Op. 36/4
Fantaisie, Op. 38
Aspirations, for piano, Op. 39/1: L'aspiration vers l'azur (Prélude)
Aspirations, for piano, Op. 39/2: Vers la tombe (élégie)
Aspirations, for piano, Op. 39/3: L'aspiration vers le caprice (Intermède)
Aspirations, for piano, Op. 39/4: L'aspiration vers l'amour (Romance)
Aspirations, for piano, Op. 39/5: L'aspiration vers la joie (Rhapsodie)
Intermède lyrique, Op. 41/1
Scherzo-caprice, Op. 41/2
Variations et Fugue sur un thème original, Op. 42
Romance, Op. 43/1
Cadenza for Beethoven’s Piano Concerto #3 in C Minor
Deux Feuilles d’album
Dumka

Instrument solo
Serenade for Violin Solo
Fantaisie for Trombone

Chamber music

Violin and piano
Violin Sonata #1 in G Major, Op. 13
Violin Sonata #2 in E Major, Op. 37

Viola and piano
Fantazja (Fantasia) for viola and piano, Op. 27 (1905)

Cello and piano
Cello Sonata in A Major, Op. 18
Fantaisie for Cello and Piano in E Major, Op. 27
Romance sans paroles in A Major for Cello and Piano

Other
Variations for two Violins, Viola and Cello, Op. 6
Fantasy for Trombone and Piano

Orchestral

Symphonies
Symphony in D Minor, Op. 21 (1893)

Piano and orchestra
Piano Concerto #1 in F Sharp Minor, Op. 3 (1891)
Rhapsody for Piano and Orchestra in D Major, Op. 23 (1904)
Piano Concerto #2 in A Flat Minor (Prologue, scherzo and variations), Op. 32 (1910)

Violin and orchestra
Romance for Violin and Orchestra in E Flat Major, Op. 20 (1919)
Violin Concerto in G Minor, Op. 22 (1900)

Cello and orchestra
Concertstuck in D Major for Cello and Orchestra, Op. 31 (1915)

Trombone and orchestra
 Fantasy for Trombone & Orchestra, Op. 27 (1905)

Other
Suite for Orchestra in E Flat Major, Op. 9 (1893)

Choral music
Le printemps, cantata for Choir and Orchestra, Op. 7
Prayer for Poland, cantata for Soprano, baritone,  chorus, orchestra and organ, Op. 40

Mélodies
Soir d'eté, Op. 11/1
Le Soleil emplit la voute, Op. 11/2
Pourquoi te cueillir, Op. 11/3
Pleure mon âme, Op. 11/4
Sur le branche l'oiseau, Op. 11/5
Où va ton rêve?, Op. 33/1
Parle de grâce!, Op. 33/2
Si tu étais un lac insondable, Op. 33/3
Comme un luth sonore, ô brise, Op. 33/4
Adieu, Op. 33/5
Invocation, Op. 33/6
À Stella
Chanson de mer
Euphonies
Krakowiak (Le Cracovien), En Route gai Cracovien
La flûte muette
Serénade
Chansons Polonaise
Memories of Poland

External links
List of compositions (in German)

 
Stojowski, Zygmunt